Elizabeth Tilley is an Australian journalist currently working as the Queensland Real Estate Editor for The Courier Mail.

Tilley was previously a newspaper reporter for the Bundaberg News-Mail and The Sunshine Coast Daily. In 2006, she became a business reporter at The Courier Mail.

In July 2010, Tilley joined Sky News as a producer and the presenter of Business Night on the Sky News Business Channel. She currently acts as a Brisbane reporter and news presenter.

References

Living people
Australian television journalists
Sky News Australia reporters and presenters
Year of birth missing (living people)
Queensland University of Technology alumni